Stock Connect may refer to:
 Shanghai-Hong Kong Stock Connect
 Shenzhen-Hong Kong Stock Connect
 Shanghai-London Stock Connect